Urgleptes ornatissimus is a species of beetle in the family Cerambycidae. It was described by Bates in 1885. It can be identified by its characteristically long antennae and light and dark-brown coloration.

References

Urgleptes
Beetles described in 1885